Razi (also Romanized as Rāzī) is a village in Qatur Rural District, Qatur District, Khoy County, West Azerbaijan Province, Iran. At the 2006 census, its population was 753, in 129 families. It contains a border crossing linking it to Kapıköy in Turkey.

References 

Populated places in Khoy County
Iran–Turkey border crossings